The Justice First is a centre-right political party in Venezuela. Founded in 1992 as a civil association, it became a political party in 2000. Henrique Capriles was the candidate of the party in 2013 general election.

History 
Justice First was created in 1992 as a civil association by a group of university students under the leadership of Alirio Abreu Burelli. The group was concerned about what they saw as a deterioration of judicial power in the country, and sought a reform of Venezuela's legal system. Abreu Burelli was magistrate of the federal Supreme Court of Justice and Vice President of the Inter-American Court of Human Rights of the Organization of American States (OAS).

The association entered the political arena during the 1999 Constituent Assembly of Venezuela, in which they presented a draft for the country's new constitution. Justice First became a political party in 2000, initially as a regional party, and registered as a national party with the National Electoral Council of Venezuela on 1 March 2002.

Justice First participated in the last minute opposition boycott of the 2005 elections, so they had no representatives in the Assembly from 2005 to 2010. They contested the 2006 presidential elections with former congressman Julio Borges, but he dropped out of the race in support of Manuel Rosales, then governor of Zulia State, and former Mayor of Maracaibo.

Henrique Capriles Radonski was elected governor of Miranda in 2008. The party had six deputies elected at the 2010 parliamentary elections: Tomas Guanipa in Zulia, Juan Carlos Caldera and Julio Borges in Miranda, Dinorah Figuera in the capital district, Richard Mardo in Aragua, and Richard Arteaga in Anzoátegui.

On 2020, José Brito and Conrado Pérez filed a complaint in the Supreme Tribunal of Justice against the leadership of Justice First. The deputies asked to be restituted in the party, saying that there was no justification to be expelled, and that their due process, right of defense and presumption of innocence had not been respected. They also asked the high court to appoint a new leadership "that was in Venezuela", since the current one was in exile, and to summon new internal elections. The deputies were received by the president of the Constitutional Chamber and the meeting lasted a little more than an hour. Outside the Supreme Tribunal, a group of around two hundred people met in support of the deputies. El Pitazo reported that earlier in the morning, some persons were handing out shirts of the party, most apparently new. Several demonstrators interviewed by the outlet expressed ignoring the reasons of the meeting or the contents of the complaint introduced. In some cases, they affirmed having been taken by bus, could not say for long they were part of Justice First, did not know that Luis Parra was not present or declared being paid for assisting. The party's secretary general, Tomás Guanipa, declared that the deputies sought to give the party's electoral card to Nicolás Maduro. In January 2020, the disputed 2020 Venezuelan National Assembly Delegated Committee election took place to determine who would be the President of the National Assembly for the period 2020-21 period; pro-government MPs and the expelled PJ deputies voted for Parra while the remaining PJ deputies endorsed incumbent president Juan Guaidó.

Ideology 

The Justice First party is a catch-all party for left-leaning and right-leaning individuals unified by a common desire to relax Venezuelan social laws and stringent authority which intrudes on the natural freedoms of Venezuela and democracy as a whole. The party includes everyone from social democrats to laissez-faire economists. Despite these differences, their opposition to the socialist Venezuelan President Nicolás Maduro unifies them and prevents serious infighting. Due to the very diverse makeup of this organization, it is difficult for foreign commentators to analyze its properties and policies. However, some of their listed policies include increasing local autonomy, abolishing the "corrupt" Constituent Assembly, and passing tax cuts and welfare/pension funding increases. Other than that, the organization remains extremely vague.

References

External links 
 Official website 

1992 establishments in Venezuela
Liberal parties in Venezuela
Organizations established in 1992
Political parties established in 2000
Political parties in Venezuela